The Constitution of the United Arab Emirates provides for freedom of religion by established customs, and the government generally respects this right in practice; however, there are some restrictions (e.g. attempts to spread Christianity among Muslims are not permitted). The federal Constitution declares that Islam is the official religion of the country; the Government does not recognize or permit conversion from Islam to another religion.

Religious demography

The country has an area of 82,880 km² (30,000 sq. mi) and a resident population of 7.4 million (2010 est.). Only approximately 20% of residents are UAE citizens. According to the CIA World Fact Book, 76% of the residents are Muslim, 9% are Christian, other (primarily Hindu and Buddhist, less than 5% of the population consists of Parsi, Baha'i, Druze, Sikh, Ahmadi, Ismaili, Dawoodi Bohra Muslim, and Jewish) 15%.   It is one of the most liberal countries found in Middle East. Foreigners are predominantly from South and Southeast Asia, although there are substantial numbers from the Middle East, Europe, Central Asia, the Commonwealth of Independent States, North America and South America. According to a ministry report, which collected census data, 76 percent of the total population is Muslim, 9 percent is Christian, and 15 percent is other. Unofficial figures estimate that at least 15 percent of the population is Hindu, 5 percent is Buddhist, and 5 percent belong to other religious groups, while the large majority of noncitizens coming in and out of the country are non Muslims, accumulating over 70% of them are largely non Muslim.  Parsi, Baháʼí, and Sikh.

Religious discrimination

In recent years, a large number of Shia Muslim expatriates have been deported from the UAE, Lebanese Shia families in particular have been deported for their alleged sympathy for extremist group Hezbollah. According to some organizations, more than 4,000 Shia expats have been deported from the UAE in recent years.

Chinese Uyghurs who relocated to the UAE after facing human rights abuse at the hands of the Beijing government were subjected to detention, torture, and deportation from Abu Dhabi. According to testimony shared by the wife of one of the detainees, China requested three major Arab countries, which included UAE, for the deportation of Uyghur migrants. The decision received major backlash and UAE authorities failed to respond when asked to comment on the deportation of Chinese Uyghurs despite not sharing an extradition agreement with China.

Apostasy

Apostasy is a crime in the United Arab Emirates. In 1978, UAE began the process of Islamising the nation's law, after its council of ministers voted to appoint a High Committee to identify all its laws that conflicted with Sharia. Among the many changes that followed, UAE incorporated hudud crimes of Sharia into its Penal Code - apostasy being one of them. Article 1 and Article 66 of UAE's Penal Code required hudud crimes to be punished with the death penalty, however no executions for apostasy have ever taken place. By virtue of Federal Decree Law No. (15) of 2020, Articles 1 and 66 of UAE's Penal Code no longer incorporate hudud crimes.

See also
Human rights in the United Arab Emirates

References

  US department of state - background note: United Arab Emirates
  International Religious Freedom Report 2007 - UAE
 United States Bureau of Democracy, Human Rights and Labor. United Arab Emirates: International Religious Freedom Report 2007. This article incorporates text from this source, which is in the public domain.

United Arab Emirates
 Human rights in the United Arab Emirates
 Religion in the United Arab Emirates